Kitboga is the Internet alias of an American Twitch streamer and YouTuber whose content primarily focuses on scam baiting against scams conducted over the phone. His channel has over 1 million followers on Twitch, and his YouTube channel has nearly 3 million subscribers.

Career

Scambaiting

In mid-2017, Kitboga found out that his grandmother had fallen victim to many scams designed to prey on the elderly, both online and in person. He then discovered "Lenny", a loop of vague pre-recorded messages that scam baiters play during calls to convince the scammer that there is a real person on the phone without providing any useful information to the scammer. After seeing these videos uploaded to YouTube, he decided to replicate the calls himself. While he started out streaming for his friends on Twitch, his viewership soon started growing beyond his immediate circles. Kitboga hopes that by wasting scammers' time, he can prevent them from scamming others, while also providing entertainment and education to his viewers.

In March 2020, with the growing prevalence of the COVID-19 pandemic, Kitboga started baiting scammers who were selling an essential oil which they dishonestly claimed was a cure for COVID-19, following a United States Federal Trade Commission warning alerting consumers of coronavirus-related scams.

In November 2020, Kitboga was signed by UTA, to expand Kitboga's anti-scam message. In May 2022, Kitboga was signed by Ryan Morrison's Evolved Talent Agency, again to expand Kitboga's goal of anti-scam messaging.

Technique
In his videos, Kitboga engages in scam baiting with several types of scammers. Besides technical support scammers, he also engages with refund scammers, IRS scammers, social security scammers, and others. He mixes elements of popular culture into his dialogue and wordplay into some calls; for example, in one March 2020 call against a scammer falsely claiming to sell a COVID-19 cure, Kitboga implied the scammer should be called "Saint Anne", eliding the two words to sound like "Satan".

To misdirect scammers away from his real identity, as well as for viewer entertainment, Kitboga often poses as many different characters during his videos, including a grandmother named either Edna, Vera, Matilda, or Bernice Anders (a play on the name Bernie Sanders), a Russian man named Vicktor Viktoor, a valley girl named Nevaeh ("Heaven" spelled backward), or a competing technical support scammer named Daniel. He does this by imitating the accent or vocal intonation of the character he is trying to portray, often with a voice changer to alter the pitch of his voice. The common factor uniting Kitboga's characters is that they are not computer-savvy, giving the scammer confidence that the scam is more likely to succeed.

The scams against which Kitboga engages in scambaiting often require the victim to install remote desktop software. As an example, in the case of technical support scams, the scammers request access to the victim's computer to "diagnose" a technical issue (where none exists), for which they then request payment to "fix". Because of the risks involved in remotely connecting to an unknown computer, Kitboga uses a different computer than his while scambaiting; the computer runs a virtual machine equipped with a virtual private network. This ensures not only that any malware or other software installed by the scammer does not affect his computer, but also hides his true IP address and location from the scammers. However, scammers can sometimes discern when a potential victim is using a virtual machine, so Kitboga and his team "have spent countless hours 'spoofing' [they're] virtual machine to look and feel like a well-used, average computer."

Types of phone scams other than the technical support scam also often involve the scammer giving some reason to connect to the victim's computer. In online refund scams, for example, the scammer requests to connect to the victim's computer to access their online banking website. When Kitboga interacts with these scammers, in addition to taking the aforementioned precautions, he also uses a fake online banking website he created specifically for use in this type of scambaiting. This website contains intentional features and Easter eggs that make it more difficult for the scammer to conduct the scam, both so that the scammer wastes additional time and for the entertainment of Kitboga's audience.

When baiting IRS scammers and other types of scammers that request payments via gift card, Kitboga uses a piece of computer code to make the gift card redemption page accept any gift code that follows a specified format. Then, when the scammer asks him to read out the gift codes so they can redeem them to take payment from the victim, he types them into his own computer and claims them himself, pretending not to know any better.

At the end of bait calls, Kitboga sometimes turns off his voice changer and reveals that he has been aware that the call was an attempted scam the entire time. Some of the scammers immediately hang up when Kitboga reveals the ruse to them. Others' reactions to this range from anger to regret, with some maintaining that they are legitimate tech support agents. Still others are unrepentantly dismissive of Kitboga's hoax, informing him that plenty of impending victims yet await on hold. In later installments Kitboga has largely moved away from revealing his true nature, for two main reasons: one being that the scammer reaction is often either to pretend to have known all along or hang up, and the other being that he finds it more entertaining to leave the scammer believing that they failed to steal from an actual potential victim.

Other work
Kitboga has actively promoted computer science education. He regularly holds computer programming streams where he maintains some of the tools he uses in his scambaiting calls. Kitboga partnered with the STEM organization FIRST in 2018 to stream the building of a real-life "meme-o-meter" as used in his scambaiting streams; during the stream, he interacted with children interested in STEM through the stream chat. He stated in 2021 that he was looking into building an AI scambaiting program.

Before starting his Twitch and YouTube channels, Kitboga worked in software engineering, and used his technical background and knowledge of virtual machines to protect himself while scambaiting. He has said that if more people become aware of the scams he tries to bait, decreasing their prevalence, he would consider returning to software engineering or changing the focus of his stream to coding or playing video games.

Awards and nominations

See also 
 Jim Browning: online alias of an anonymous British YouTube personality whose specialty is scambaiting

References

External links 
 

English-language YouTube channels
Twitch (service) streamers
Unidentified people
Hackers
Hacking in the 2010s
Hacking in the 2020s
Technology YouTubers
Social engineering (computer security)
Internet vigilantism
YouTube channels launched in 2017